Joe Petro III (born May 3, 1956) is a second-generation fine artist who works as a sculptor in bronze, clay and printmaking on silk-screen and handmade paper.  He majored in Zoology at the University of Tennessee, Knoxville. He worked with Kurt Vonnegut Jr in Vonnegut's later years on silk-screen prints of Vonnegut's artwork.

References

External links
 Joe Petro home page bio

American artists
1956 births
Living people